The South Lafayette Street Creole Cottages is a grouping of three historic Creole cottages on South Lafayette Street in Mobile, Alabama, United States.  They were built in 1852.  All three were placed as a group on the National Register of Historic Places on November 7, 1976.

References

Houses completed in 1852
National Register of Historic Places in Mobile, Alabama
Houses on the National Register of Historic Places in Alabama
Houses in Mobile, Alabama
Creole cottage architecture in Alabama
1852 establishments in Alabama